Grease: Rise of the Pink Ladies is an upcoming American musical romantic comedy television series created by Annabel Oakes for Paramount+. The series is a prequel to the film Grease (1978), based on the stage musical of the same name by Jim Jacobs and Warren Casey. It is scheduled to premiere on April 6, 2023.

Premise
The series takes place in 1954, four years before the events of Grease, and follows four fed-up and misfit students who band together to bring out the moral panic that will change Rydell High forever and become the founding mothers of the first high school clique known as the "Pink Ladies".

Cast and characters

Main
 Marisa Davila as Jane
 Cheyenne Isabel Wells as Olivia
 Ari Notartomaso as Cynthia
 Tricia Fukuhara as Nancy
 Shanel Bailey as Hazel
 Madison Thompson as Susan
 Johnathan Nieves as Richie
 Jason Schmidt as Buddy
 Maxwell Whittington-Cooper as Wally
 Jackie Hoffman as Asst. Principal McGee

Recurring
 Chris McNally as Mr. Daniels
 Charlotte Kavanagh as Rosemary
 Josette Halpert as Dot
 Nicholas McDonough as Gil
 Maximo Weber Salas as Shy Guy
 Alexis Sides as Potato
 Niamh Wilson as Lydia

Episodes

Production

Development
The series was given a straight-to-series order by WarnerMedia in October 2019 under the title Grease: Rydell High, set to air on their streaming service HBO Max. In April 2020, Annabel Oakes was hired to write the pilot episode and act as executive producer for the series. In May 2020, the title of the series was changed to Grease: Rise of the Pink Ladies, and it was announced that the series is set to premiere in 2021.

In October 2020, it was announced that the series would instead premiere on Paramount+ after Chief Content Officer for HBO and HBO Max Casey Bloys decided to not move forward with the series at HBO Max. Along with the change of network, Annabel Oakes was announced to serve as creator of the series. In July 2021, the series was given a ten-episode series order officially by Paramount+. Marty Bowen and Erik Feig joined the series as executive producers. Alethea Jones was announced as a producer in October 2021 and will also direct the first episode.

Casting
On January 31, 2022, it was reported that Marisa Davila, Cheyenne Isabel Wells, Ari Notartomaso, Tricia Fukuhara, Shanel Bailey, (as the Pink Ladies) Madison Thompson, Johnathan Nieves, Jason Schmidt, Maxwell Whittington-Cooper, and Jackie Hoffman were cast in starring roles. In February 2022, it was announced Chris McNally, Charlotte Kavanagh, Josette Halpert, Nicholas McDonough, Maximo Weber Salas, and Alexis Sides joined the cast in recurring capacities.

Filming
The series was initially scheduled to be filmed in California after receiving a tax credit to shoot in the state. On January 31, 2022, it was reported that production had begun in Vancouver, British Columbia.

Release
The premiere of Grease: Rise of the Pink Ladies was first earmarked for early 2023 in a story in Entertainment Weekly in December 2022. On January 9, 2023, the series was announced at a Television Critics Association panel to premiere on April 6, 2023.

References

External links
 

American musical comedy television series
American romantic comedy television series
English-language television shows
Grease (musical)
Paramount+ original programming
Television series based on adaptations
Television series by Paramount Television
Television series set in the 1950s
Television shows filmed in Vancouver
Upcoming comedy television series